Hamm (Latin: Hammona) is a city in North Rhine-Westphalia, Germany. It is located in the northeastern part of the Ruhr area. As of 2016 its population was 179,397. The city is situated between the A1 motorway and A2 motorway. Hamm railway station is an important hub for rail transport and renowned for its distinctive station building.

History

Coat of arms
The coat of arms has been in use in its present form for about 750 years. It shows the markish chessboard ("märkischen Schachbalken") in red and silver on a golden field. Originally it was the founders' coat of arms, i. e. the Counts of Mark. The chessboard and the colours are often displayed in the coats of arms of further towns founded by that family line. Similarly, the colours of the city are red and white.

Overview
The name Ham means "corner" in the old Low German dialect spoken at that time. In the old times the name thom Hamme would be used, which evolved slowly into its modern form Hamm. The name derives from the description of the Hamm's location in the corner of the Lippe river and the narrow Ahse affluent, where it was founded on Ash Wednesday in March 1226 by Count Adolf I of the Mark. 

1350 The Black death killed nearly all of the citizens. Only seven families survived.
1469 Hamm became a member of the Hanseatic League. It was one of the most powerful towns in the region, while the large cities of the today's Ruhr area still were only tiny villages.
1614 The Treaty of Xanten ends the conflict about the heritage of Cleve-Mark, the Electorate Brandenburg (later Prussia) inherited the Ducal Cleve and the counties Ravensburg and Mark (with Hamm)
1618-1648 Thirty Years' War, Hamm was taken several times by different armed forces and had to endure changing garrisons. Almost all buildings were destroyed, except for the main church St. Georg (today: Pauluskirche) and St. Agnes church.
1657 Establishment of the Gymnasium illustre (later named Gymnasium Hammonense) with three faculties (theology, jurisprudence and philosophy).
1753 Establishment of the regional court (Landgericht)
1767 "Märkische Kammerdeputation" established
1769 Brewery Isenbeck founded
1787 Changing of the "Märkische Kammerdeputation" into the "Märkische Kriegs- und Domänenkammer" by the Prussian "Generaldirektorium".
1818 Hamm has 4,688 inhabitants.
1820 The regional appeal court moves from Cleve to Hamm.
1847 First train stops at the main station Hamm
1853 Westfälische Union (later Thyssen Draht AG) was founded
1856 Westfälische Draht Industrie was founded (later Klöckner Draht GmbH, today Westfälische Draht Industrie (WDI))
1901 30,000 inhabitants, the district Hamm is split up into the urban district of Hamm (City) and the district of Unna.
1901 Coal-mine de Wendel in Herringen starts mining (later Heinrich-Robert, now Bergwerk Ost) (first coal output 1904)
1902 Coal-mine Maximilian in Werries/Ostwennemar starts mining (first coal output 1907)
1905 Coal-mine Radbod in Bockum-Hövel starts mining (first coal output 1905)
1912 Coal-mine Sachsen in Heessen starts mining (first coal output 1914)
1914 Datteln-Hamm-Canal is completed including the new city port
1938 The A2 (motorway) reaches Hamm
1939-1945 55 air raids destroy nearly 60% of the old city and leave only a few historical buildings.
1944 Coal-mine Maximillian closes after several problems with water drainage of the hole mine (completely flooded in 1914).
1945 First meeting of the city council after the war
1946 Establishment of the industrial court and the industrial court of appeal by the Allied Control Council.
1953 Windsor Boys' School opens for the children on British Service personnel   
1956 Sport airfield founded in the Lippe meadows.
1965 A1 (motorway) reaches Hamm.
1976 Coal-mine Sachsen closes
1983 Windsor Boys' School closes -  View the Virtual Tour of the Windsor School / Windsor Boys School Hamm, Germany

1984 First Landesgartenschau (horticultural show of the federal state) of North Rhine-Westphalia is held in Hamm. The old area of the coal-mine Maximillian was used for this purpose. The world greatest Glasselefant is built as main attraction and until today is one of the major landmarks of the city.
1990 Coal-mine Radbod closes.
2002 Consecration of the Sri Kamadchi Ampal-Temple
2005 Establishment of the university of applied sciences "SRH Fachhochschule Hamm"

Population development

Until 1833 any population is an approximation, in later times the population was counted or updated by the local government or other institutions of the government. 

¹ "Volkszählungsergebnis" counted population

Politics and structure

Mayor
The current Mayor (Oberbürgermeister) of Hamm is Marc Herter of the Social Democratic Party (SPD) since 2020. The Mayor is directly elected for a five year term. Prior to the 1999 local administration reform in North Rhine-Westphalia, the Oberstadtdirektor was the chief executive of the city, and was chosen by the city council.

The most recent mayoral election was held on 13 September 2020, with a runoff held on 27 September, and the results were as follows:

! rowspan=2 colspan=2| Candidate
! rowspan=2| Party
! colspan=2| First round
! colspan=2| Second round
|-
! Votes
! %
! Votes
! %
|-
| bgcolor=| 
| align=left| Marc Herter
| align=left| Social Democratic Party
| 28,775
| 40.7
| 42,190
| 63.6
|-
| bgcolor=| 
| align=left| Thomas Hunsteger-Petermann
| align=left| Christian Democratic Union
| 26,464
| 37.4
| 24,177
| 36.4
|-
| bgcolor=| 
| align=left| Arnela Sačić
| align=left| Alliance 90/The Greens
| 5,086
| 7.2
|-
| bgcolor=| 
| align=left| Pierre Jung
| align=left| Alternative for Germany
| 3,137
| 4.4
|-
| bgcolor=| 
| align=left| Ingo Müller
| align=left| Free Democratic Party
| 2,476
| 3.5
|-
| 
| align=left| Cevdet Gürle
| align=left| Pro Hamm
| 1,829
| 2.6
|-
| bgcolor=| 
| align=left| Gerd Heistermann
| align=left| Independent
| 1,190
| 1.7
|-
| bgcolor=| 
| align=left| Sandra Riveiro Vega
| align=left| The Left
| 1,111
| 1.6
|-
| bgcolor=| 
| align=left| Peter Kessler
| align=left| Independent
| 496
| 0.7
|-
| bgcolor=#553A26| 
| align=left| Christian Worch
| align=left| The Right
| 173
| 0.2
|-
! colspan=3| Valid votes
! 70,737
! 99.0
! 66,367
! 99.3
|-
! colspan=3| Invalid votes
! 729
! 1.0
! 491
! 0.7
|-
! colspan=3| Total
! 71,466
! 100.0
! 66,858
! 100.0
|-
! colspan=3| Electorate/voter turnout
! 136,561
! 52.3
! 136,467
! 49.0
|-
| colspan=7| Source: State Returning Officer
|}

City council

The Hamm city council governs the city alongside the Mayor. The most recent city council election was held on 13 September 2020, and the results were as follows:

! colspan=2| Party
! Votes
! %
! +/-
! Seats
! +/-
|-
| bgcolor=| 
| align=left| Social Democratic Party (SPD)
| 25,992
| 37.1
|  2.0
| 22
|  2
|-
| bgcolor=| 
| align=left| Christian Democratic Union (CDU)
| 23,385
| 33.4
|  9.2
| 19
|  6
|-
| bgcolor=| 
| align=left| Alliance 90/The Greens (Grüne)
| 8,925
| 12.7
|  5.5
| 7
|  3
|-
| bgcolor=| 
| align=left| Free Democratic Party (FDP)
| 3,575
| 5.1
|  1.0
| 3
|  1
|-
| bgcolor=| 
| align=left| Alternative for Germany (AfD)
| 3,274
| 4.7
|  4.0
| 3
|  3
|-
| 
| align=left| Pro Hamm (WG Pro)
| 2,555
| 3.6
|  0.8
| 2
| ±0
|-
| bgcolor=| 
| align=left| The Left (Die Linke)
| 2,068
| 2.9
|  1.4
| 2
|  1
|-
| colspan=7 bgcolor=lightgrey| 
|-
| bgcolor=#553A26| 
| align=left| The Right (Die Rechte)
| 213
| 0.3
|  0.6
| 0
|  1
|-
| bgcolor=| 
| align=left| Free Voters (FW)
| 122
| 0.2
|  0.2
| 0
| ±0
|-
! colspan=2| Valid votes
! 70,109
! 98.4
! 
! 
! 
|-
! colspan=2| Invalid votes
! 1,163
! 1.6
! 
! 
! 
|-
! colspan=2| Total
! 71,272
! 100.0
! 
! 58
! ±0
|-
! colspan=2| Electorate/voter turnout
! 136,561
! 52.2
!  0.7
! 
! 
|-
| colspan=7| Source: State Returning Officer
|}

Incorporations
In 1939, 1968 and 1975 Hamm incorporated several towns and municipalities: in 1939 the village Mark (which the Counts and the county took the name of) and in 1968 the villages of Berge and Westtünnen. In the reorganisation of 1975, the following towns and municipalities were incorporated into the City of Hamm: 

The town of Bockum-Hövel, Lüdinghausen district
The town of Heessen, Beckum district
The municipality of Uentrop, Unna district, formed in 1968, including the municipalities of Braam-Ostwennemar, Frielinghausen, Haaren, Norddinker, Schmehausen, Uentrop, Vöckinghausen and Werries
The municipality of Rhynern, (Unna district, without Hilbeck incorporated by Werl), formed in 1968, including the municipalities of Allen, Freiske, Hilbeck, Osterflierich, Osttünnen, Rhynern, Süddinker and Wambeln
 The municipality of Pelkum, (Unna district), formed in 1968, including the municipalities of Herringen, Lerche, Pelkum, Sandbochum, Weetfeld and parts of Wiescherhöfen.

The number of citizens more than doubles from 83.000 in 1974 to 173.000 in 1975.

City structure

Hamm has seven quarters, each divided into residential areas like City, which actually means the center of the city around the Pauluschurch or like Hövel-Radbod near the former entrance to the coalmine Radbod in the quarter Bockum-Hövel. The following table shows the situation in 2006. Every quarter is named with the prefix Hamm, like Hamm-Bockum-Hövel or Hamm-Mitte.

The former town Bockum-Hövel today forms the quarter with the largest number of inhabitants, closely followed by the centre of the city Hamm-Mitte. The latter is the smallest quarter by metric size.

Twin towns – sister cities

Hamm is twinned with:

 Neufchâteau, France (1967)
 Santa Monica, United States (1969)
 Bradford, England, UK (1976)
 Chattanooga, United States (1977)
 Mazatlán, Mexico (1978)
 Toul, France (1987)
 Oranienburg, Germany (1990)
 Kalisz, Poland (1991)
 Afyonkarahisar, Turkey (2006)

Miscellaneous
In 2006 Hamm was the first city to accomplish a "Ratsbürgerentscheid" (citizens decision). Subject of the plebiscite was a plan to build a 43 ha city lake (2007–2010) near the city centre. 136,521 citizens were entitled to vote, 57,563 used that possibility and 56.9% refused their approbation for the project. As minimal vote 20% (of the total 136,521 voters) had to decide between one of the possibilities (20% for Yes or 20% for NO). The city council accepted the voting and stopped the plans. 
This procedure is planned for future projects in NRW.
Also in Hamm established was the  "Baugerichtstag e. V." a society organizing a congress about the German building law. The congress is held in a two years term.

Health
The largest health facility is the Marien Hospital with its two separate buildings, Marien Hospital I the old building within the centre of the city and Marien Hospital II together 587 beds.  Then there is the (EVK Hamm) Evangelisches Krankenhaus Hamm (Protestant Hospital) combined with the children's hospital south of the centre together 493 beds, the St. Barbara Klinik (Clinic) in Heessen with 422 beds and the Malteser Krankenhaus (Hospital) St. Josef in Bockum-Hövel with 260 beds. Additional there are the Klinik für manuelle Therapie (Clinic for manual therapy) within the quarter Bad Hamm (138 beds), the cure district. The Westfälisches Institut Hamm für Kinder- und Jugendpsychiatrie und psychotherapie (Westphalian Institute Hamm for Children's- and Youth psychiatry and psychotherapy) as an Institute of the federal state (158 beds) and the private Klinik (clinic) am Bärenbrunnen. (All Hospitals together have 2058 beds.)
Former Hospitals are: 
 The BWK Bundeswehrkrankenhaus Hamm (Hospital of the Federal Defence Forces) closed in 2007 after a reform of the German forces
 Knappschaftskrankenhaus (Hospital operated by the health fund for miners (Bundesknappschaft) now Marien Hospital II)
 Märkische Kinderklinik (Children's Hospital combined with the Elisabeth Kinderklinik and now part of the EVK Hamm as "Klinik für Kinder- und Jugendmedizin")
 The St. Elisabeth Kinderklinik (Children's Hospital combined with the Märkische Kinderklinik and now part of the EVK Hamm as "Klinik für Kinder- und Jugendmedizin")

Education
Hamm has six Gymnasien (grammar schools), two comprehensive schools and several Realschulen, Hauptschulen and Grundschulen (elementary schools). The oldest Gymnasium in Hamm is the Gymnasium Hammonense which was established as academic school (small university) with three faculties in 1657. The school declined in its importance and in 1781 merged with the local Latin school and got reformed by Prussia. The new combined school was humanist Gymnasium. In 1867 the "Märkisches Gymnasium" followed as the second Gymnasium of Hamm, in 1902 the "Freiherr vom Stein Gymnasium", in 1924 the "Beisenkamp Gymnasium" – first as "Oberlyceum" (Gymnasium for girls) – and in 1968 the  "Galilei-Gymnasium" were established. Additionally in Schloss Heessen there is a private school including the Gymnasium. Both comprehensive schools in Hamm are younger foundations by the city during school reforms of NRW.
Hamm is also well known for its many vocational schools: 
 "Eduard Spranger Berufskolleg für Technik" a vocational school for techniques
 "Elisabeth Lüders Berufskolleg für Sozialwesen, Gesundheit, Hauswirtschaft und Kinderpflege" a vocational school for social welfare, health, home economics and child care, and several other schools.
 "Friederich List Berufskolleg für Wirtschaft" a trade school
In 2005 a small private university of applied sciences was established, the "SRH Fachhoschule Hamm".
The private university of applied sciences started with two study programs ending with degrees of Bachelor and Master of Science for logistic engineering.
The "Klinik  für Psychatrie und Psychotherapie of the Marienhospital" cooperates with the University Witten-Herdecke in education and science.
During the summer 2009 another university of applied sciences was founded by the federal state NRW, named Hochschule Hamm-Lippstadt. The University is divided in two departments, each with its own small Campus area, one in Hamm and another in Lippstadt.

Industry and economy 

Major industrial branches are the coal-mining industry, steel industry,  chemical industry and the car component supplier industry.
In the last century there were four coal-mines within the urban district. Today the Bergwerk Ost in Herringen is the last operating coal mine with about 3,000 employees.
Mannesmann Hoesch Präzisrohr, Westfälische Draht Industrie (WDI) and Böhler Thyssen Welding are the major representatives of the steel industry, the chemical industry is represented by DuPont in Uentrop and the car supplier industry by Hella KGaA Hueck & Co. factory 4 in Bockum-Hövel with about 1000 employees.
The energy industry is represented by a RWE coal power plant and a further power plant (Trianel) in Uentrop. A new coal power plant is currently under construction. The THTR-300, also in Uentrop-Schmehhausen, was decommissioned in 1989.
Alongside the A2, in the southern part of the urban district, a new business park inhabits the growing logistics business.
Hamm is also known as "City of Law" (Stadt des Rechts) because of the greatest German regional appeal court (Oberlandesgericht), the local court (Amtsgericht), the industrial court (Arbeitgericht) and the industrial appeal court (Landesarbeitsgericht).  The Chamber of Notaries and bar association of the regional appeal court Hamm and the courts are of greater influence on the appearance of the city.
Several hospitals in the urban district are also important employers, for example the EVK Hamm has about 1000 employees.

Media
The only daily newspaper of Hamm printed there, is the "Westfälischer Anzeiger". At first, a weekly, newspaper in Hamm was the "Kreis Hammsches Wochenblatt" founded by Heinich Jakob Grote in 1822. Its name was changed in 1848 to "Westfälischer Anzeiger". A second newspaper appeared, founded by the Thiemann family, the "Westfälische Kurier". Both co-existed until the end of the Second World War. After the War both newspapers were combined and named "Westfälischer Anzeiger und Kurier". In the 1960s another name-change made the "Westfälischer Anzeiger". This newspaper is the mantle of several smaller regional newspapers, together they had a total 153,428 copies in 2004. In the 1970s the "Westdeutsche Allgemeine Zeitung" unsuccessfully tried to establish its own daily newspaper. 
Two weekly newspapers appear in Hamm the "Stadtanzeiger" from the "Westfälischer Anzeiger" with a total of 384.000 copies and the Sonntags-Rundblick by a medium-sized local company.
Since 1990 the local radio station "Radio Lippewelle Hamm" is On Air and number one radio station of the local radios in NRW. 
On 3 October 1993 the "Offener Kanal Hamm" started broadcasting, it is a small TV project by people for the people, started through the federal state.

Culture
The Waldbühne Hamm-Heessen is one of the most active open-air theatres in Germany. The Alfred Fischer Hall is a multi-purpose event location in Heessen in a former machinery hall built by Alfred Fischer in 1912. The Städtische Musikschule Hamm is one of the oldest music schools in Germany. Hamm also has several active choirs and a jazz club and has been the home of many bands.

Transport

Roads
Hamm is linked to three motorways. The Bundesautobahn 1 (BAB 1 or A1, Puttgarden-Saarbrücken) named Hansaline with two connections No.81 and 82., the (BAB 2 or A2, Oberhausen-Berlin) with three connections No.17,18 and 19 and the A445 (Hamm-Arnsberg) which is connected by the B63 until the planned construction between Hamm and Werl is completed. The Kamener Kreuz is situated in the southwest of Hamm. Two "federal roads" (Bundesstrassen) the B61 and B63 intersect in the city centre. Several state roads (Landesstrassen) are connecting Hamm with its neighbouring towns and municipalities.

Railways

Hamm has three stations, the main railway station Hamm (Westfalen) and two minor stations, one in Bockum-Hövel and the other one in Heessen. The main station is one of the biggest railway hubs in Germany, and connected with one of the largest marshalling yards in Europe, the latter now only partly operating. Notable is the railway station for its Art deco Gründerzeit inspired building styles. Hamm has been connected to the rail since 2 May 1847. Its huge railroad yard—Europe's biggest at the time—was bombed repeatedly during World War II, as was the city itself (in December 1944 it was hit by eleven raids on one day).

Buses
The city bus net Hamm is served by the "Stadtwerke Hamm", with 65 buses, and the "Verkehrsgesellschaft Breitenbach". A regional bus service is served by different companies and both nets serve the central bus station, which is situated in front of the main railway station in the centre of Hamm. Hamm is part of the Verkehrsgemeinschaft Ruhr-Lippe. About 12 million people are using the bus net every year, transported by 50 bus lines with 500 bus stops within the city.

Canal
Hamm is the end of the "Datteln-Hamm-Kanal", three ports are situated in the urban district.
The city port, the canal end port Uentrop, and the port of "Gersteinwerk". The ports of Hamm are the second biggest canal port by freight transact, 1.4 million tons a year by ships and 0.5 million tons by train. The city port allows for ships up to 110 metres length 11.45 meters width and 2.7 metres draft. It is linked with the railway by a track to the near main railway station and the marshaling yard.

Airfield and Airports
Near city centre, in the meadows of the River Lippe, the sport airfield Hamm is situated. Its runway is 900 m long and 30 m wide. The airfield is operated by the Luftsportclub Hamm e. V..
Hamm is situated in the middle of a triangle of three smaller International Airports, in the north the Münster Osnabrück International Airport (FMO) in the south-west Dortmund Airport and in the east Paderborn Lippstadt Airport.
The nearest large International Airport is Düsseldorf Airport.

Notable people
1770, 5 April, Rulemann Friedrich Eylert, pastor of the Reformed Church in Hamm, ev. bishop in Potsdam
1820, 25 December, Fred. "Fritz" Schmitz, farmer, musician and member of the Wisconsin State Assembly
1824, 13 April, Friedrich Kapp, German-American attorney, author and politician
1832, February 19, Karl Hopf, German historian and Byzantinist
1891, 27 March, Hans Siemsen, journalist and author
1902, 2 June, Joachim von Elbe jurist, member of legal department of the US military government in Germany after the Second World War.
1903, 5 February, Fritz Everding, naturalistic painter and graphic artist
1906, Gerd Bucerius, publisher („Die Zeit" from 1959) and publicist (founder of the publishing house Gruner und Jahr), died 1995
1907, Ludwig Biermann, astronomer, died 1986
1907, Josef Veldtrup educationalist and poet
1909, Jean Berger, pianist and composer, died 2002
1923, Heinz Wallberg, conductor, died 2004
1926, Karl Otto Conrad, literary scientist, publisher, lyric poet („Der Neue Conrady. Das große deutsche Gedichtbuch")
1927, Hanns Joachim Friedrichs, TV-Journalist and moderator („Tagesthemen"), died 1995
1927, Friedrich Hirzebruch, mathematician, founder and first director of the Max Planck Institute for Mathematics in Bonn, died 2012
1928, Werner Giers, † April 8, 2016, journalist
1930, Almuth Lütkenhaus, visual artist, died 1996
1946, Werner Brinkmann, jurist, director of Stiftung Warentest between 1995 and the end of 2011
1948, Bernard Dietz, named „Ennatz", footballer
1951, Horst Hrubesch, footballer 
1953, Josef Kaczor, nicknamed „Jupp", footballer
1954, Jutta Weber, swimmer, Summer Olympics 1972-1976
1960, Klaus J. Behrendt, actor ("Tatort-Kommissar Max Ballauf")
1960, Ursula Neugebauer, artist
1964, Michael Lusch, footballer and football coach
1964, Uwe Kröger, musical actor
1965, Richard Klophaus, economist
1975, Christian Vinck, former tennis player
1978, İsmail YK, musician
1978, Selma Ergeç, Turkish-German actress and model
1981, Anna Bornhoff, footballer
1983, Mike Hanke, retired footballer who last played for Guizhou Renhe
1991, Kevin Mirocha, Polish-German racing driver
2001, Sjoeke Nüsken, footballer
2015, Giant Rooks, band of Frederik Rabe, Luca Göttner, Finn Thomas, Finn Schwieters, and Jonathan Wichniowski

Freemen
The city of Hamm has made since 1945 the following people freemen:
 1946: Josef Schlichter
 1953: Hugo Bröcker
 1954: Josef Weidekamp
 1959: Peter Röttgen
 1959: Ferdinand Poggel
 1965: Heinrich Luhmann
 1971: Gerhard Krampe
 1990: Werner Figgen
 1990: Günter Rinsche
 1994: Felix Ziethmann

References

External links

 City Wiki for Hamm, in German
 The official site for Hamm, in German
 
Virtual Tour of the Windsor School / Windsor Boys School Hamm, Germany

 
Cities in North Rhine-Westphalia
1226 establishments in Europe
Members of the Hanseatic League